Kuortane is a municipality of Finland. It is located in the South Ostrobothnia region. The neighboring municipalities of Kuortane are Alajärvi, Alavus, Lapua and Seinäjoki. The municipality is unilingually Finnish.

Kuortane has a notable history of pine tar production. It is currently well known for the Kuortaneen urheilulukio, a sports institute (Olympic Training centre) and training facility where many young Finnish athletes study and train. Both the women's national under-18 ice hockey team and Team Kuortane of the Naisten Liiga are based at the institute. Kuortane is also known as the birthplace of world-famous architect Alvar Aalto.

Notable people
 Alvar Aalto (1898–1976), architect and designer
 Osmo Ala-Honkola (1939–2020), Olympic sport shooter
 Reino Ala-Kulju (1898–1983), Lutheran clergyman, politician, and teacher
 Mira Suhonen (born 1985), Olympic sport shooter

See also
 Kuortaneen urheilulukio
Kuortaneen Urheiluopisto

References

External links

Municipality of Kuortane – Official website 
Kuortane Olympic Training Center  – Official website 

 
Municipalities of South Ostrobothnia